Julie Doyle may refer to:

 Julie Doyle (soccer, born 1996), American former soccer player born in 1996
 Julie Doyle (soccer, born 1998), American soccer player born in 1998